Arthur Dong is an American filmmaker and author whose work centers on Asia America and anti-gay prejudice. He was raised in San Francisco, California, graduating from Galileo High School in June 1971. He received his BA in film from San Francisco State University and also holds a Directing Fellow Certificate from the American Film Institute Center for Advanced Film Studies. In 2007, SFSU named Dong its Alumnus of the year “for his continued success in the challenging arena of independent documentary filmmaking and his longstanding commitment to social justice."

Dong is a member of the Academy of Motion Picture Arts and Sciences where he served on the Board of Governors from 2002 to 2006 (Documentary Branch). He is also a member of the Academy of Television Arts & Sciences, and has served on the boards of Film Independent (formerly IFP/West), the National Film Preservation Board at the Library of Congress, and Outfest. At the Academy, he was among the original architects that advocated for and founded the Academy's Documentary Branch in 2001; he was also a decade-long member of the organization's Documentary Executive Committee that helped to shape the new branch. During his tenure at the National Film Preservation Board, he successfully nominated and lobbied for the selection of two seminal Chinese American films into the National Film Registry: Flower Drum Song (1961) and The Curse of Quon Gwon (1916), the earliest known film produced and directed by an Asian American that Mr. Dong helped re-discover while researching for his Hollywood Chinese documentary.

Career 
In 1982, Dong founded DeepFocus Productions, Inc, where he continues to serve as producer, director, writer, and distributor.  He received a nomination for an Academy Award for Documentary Short Subject in 1984 for Sewing Woman, a film about his mother's immigration from China to America; a Peabody Award in 1995 for Coming Out Under Fire, which documented the US military's WW2 policy on gays in the military; and two Sundance Film Festival Awards for his profile of convicted murderers who killed gay men, Licensed to Kill.  Other honors include five Emmy nominations, the Berlin Film Festival's Teddy Award, the Golden Horse Award from Taiwan, as well as being selected a Sundance Documentary Fellow, a Guggenheim Fellow in Film, and a Rockefeller Fellow in Media Arts.

For television, Dong was an associate producer for KGO-TV in San Francisco from 1981 to 1982 and a producer at KCET in Los Angeles from 1991 to 1992 (producing for Life & Times). For ITVS, he produced and directed Out Rage '69, which chronicled the Stonewall Riots and premiered the PBS series on LBGT rights, The Question of Equality. His 1989 film on Chinatown nightclubs Forbidden City, USA was broadcast on the American Experience series, and his 2007 documentary on the history of the Chinese in American feature films Hollywood Chinese was broadcast on the series American Masters, which won the Emmy that year for outstanding non-fiction series. His latest film The Killing Fields of Dr. Haing S. Ngor, about the Cambodian genocide under the Khmer Rouge, was the premiere episode of the PBS/World Channel series DocWorld.

Career retrospectives of Dong's films have been presented at the Hawaii International Film Festival, the Human Rights International Film Festival in Warsaw Poland, the Walker Art Center, and in Taiwan: the Golden Horse Film Festival and the CNEX Documentary Film Festival. In 2015, he was the Spotlight filmmaker and artist at CAAMFest, the Los Angeles Asian Pacific Film Festival, and the New York Asian American Film Festival.

Dong has served as curator for the exhibits Chop Suey on Wax: The Flower Drum Song Album at the Chinese Historical Society Museum in San Francisco; Hollywood Chinese: The Arthur Dong Collection at the Chinese American Museum in Los Angeles; and Forbidden City, USA: Chinese American Nightclubs at the San Francisco Public Library. His current exhibition, Hollywood Chinese @ the Formosa, is currently on display at the Formosa Cafe in West Hollywood.

Dong has taught documentary film at Sundance's Documentary Workshops in Beijing, the Sundance Music and Sound Design Labs at Skywalker, UC Santa Barbara, Emory University, University of Texas, University of Hawai'i, and the CNEX Chinese Doc Academy in Taipei. He also served as Distinguished Professor in Film at Loyola Marymount University where he designed MFA and certificate documentary programs.

Filmography 
Public (1970)
Sewing Woman (1982)
Lotus (1987)
Forbidden City, U.S.A. (1989)
Claiming a Voice: The Visual Communications Story ( 1990)
Coming Out Under Fire (1994)
The Question of Equality (1995)
Licensed To Kill (1997)
Family Fundamentals (2002)
Hollywood Chinese (2007)
The Killing Fields of Dr. Haing S. Ngor (2015)

Books
Dong is the author of Forbidden City, USA: Chinatown Nightclubs, 1936-1970 (2014), which received the American Book Award, the Independent Publisher's IPPY Award, and the Preservation Award from the Art Deco Society of California. Dong's latest book is titled Hollywood Chinese: The Chinese in American Feature Films, which received the Asian/Pacific American Award for Literature, and was selected a "Critic's Choice" by Kenneth Turan of the Los Angeles Times, and one of "13 Smart Must-Read Books on Race and Hate" by the Advocate.

Community honors 

James Wong Howe Award (The Jimmy)  from the Association of Asian Pacific American Artists
Steve Tatsukawa Award  from Visual Communications
Asian American Media Award from Asian CineVision
Historian Award from the Chinese Historical Society of America
GLAAD Media Awards (two consecutive plus third nomination)
San Francisco Foundation James D. Phelan Award in Filmmaking
Paul Monette Award
OUT 100 Award from Out Magazine
Historymakers Award, Chinese American Museum.
LGBT Pioneer Honoree, Los Angeles Pride 
LGBT History Month Icon, Equality Forum 
Spotlight Honoree, CAAM: the Center for Asian American Media

References

External links 
 
 DeepFocus Productions
 Nichi Bei Times Interview, April 17, 2008

1953 births
Living people
American documentary filmmakers
American film directors of Chinese descent
San Francisco State University alumni
LGBT people from California
American LGBT people of Asian descent
American Book Award winners
Film directors from San Francisco
21st-century LGBT people